Stein Jorgensen (born July 12, 1962) is an American sprint canoer who has competed from the mid-1990s to the early 2000s (decade). He won a gold medal in the K-2 200 m event at the 1995 ICF Canoe Sprint World Championships in Duisburg.

Jorgensen also competed in two Summer Olympics, earning his best finish of sixth in the K-4 1000 m event at Sydney in 2000.

He was born in San Diego.  He was one of the US team's coaches for the 2012 Summer Olympics, for the sprint canoe events.

References

Sports-Reference.com profile

1962 births
American male canoeists
Canoeists at the 1996 Summer Olympics
Canoeists at the 2000 Summer Olympics
Living people
Olympic canoeists of the United States
Sportspeople from San Diego
ICF Canoe Sprint World Championships medalists in kayak